World Opponent Network (WON) was an online gaming service created by Sierra Games as the Sierra Internet Gaming System (SIGS). WON was used by games such as Homeworld, Half-Life, Outpost 2, Star Trek: Armada, Soldier of Fortune, Dark Reign 2, Silencer,  and ARC in addition to online versions of casino games and early entries in the Hoyle games series.

History 
WON was launched in April 1998. Sierra was purchased by Havas in January 1999, and Cendant Software was acquired by Havas Interactive, who would then maintain WON. In March 2000, Havas Interactive merged WON.net with Prize Central Net to form Flipside.com. Regardless, games such as Valve's Half-Life continued to use the service.

In 2001, Valve acquired WON from Flipside.com and began to implement the Steam system in beta form. Over the next few years, as Steam was developed and tested, WON continued to operate.

Valve shut down the last of its WON servers on July 31, 2004. All online portions of Valve's games were transferred to their own Steam system. The announcement disappointed some of the long-time Half-Life and Counter-Strike players who had become accustomed to the older versions of those games still being hosted on the WON servers. For example, WON servers hosted version 1.5 of Counter-Strike, while Valve's Steam system required users to update to the newer version 1.6.

WON2 

After the shutdown of WON, some players continued to run patched versions of the games Half-Life or Counter-Strike to connect to a free service called WON2, a clone of WON. It allows users to use the original server browser to connect to Half-Life servers, and their various mods, including Counter-Strike 1.5 and a Steamless version of 1.6.

At its height, between the years 2005 and 2010, over 1,000 servers and 5,000 to 10,000 players were online at any time, marking WON2 as the largest unofficial multiplayer gaming network in the world. As of December 29, 2017, WON2 is still operational with hundreds of players connected to the server playing Counter-Strike 1.5 at peak hours, with the majority of the servers being hosted in China.

References

Multiplayer video game services
Sierra Entertainment
Valve Corporation